The 1928 FA Cup final was contested by Blackburn Rovers and Huddersfield Town at Wembley Stadium. Blackburn won 3–1, with goals from Jack Roscamp (2) and Tommy McLean. Alex Jackson scored Huddersfield's goal, making this the first final in 18 years where both teams scored. It would be the last major trophy that Blackburn Rovers would win for the next 67 years, their next major honour being the FA Premier League title in 1995.

Road to the Final

Blackburn Rovers
Round 3: Blackburn Rovers 4–1 Newcastle United

Round 4: Exeter City 2–2 Blackburn Rovers
Replay: Blackburn Rovers 3–1 Exeter City

Round 5: Blackburn Rovers 2–1 Port Vale

Round 6: Blackburn Rovers 2–0 Manchester United

Semi-Final: Blackburn Rovers 1–0 Arsenal
(at Filbert Street, Leicester)

Huddersfield Town
Round 3: Huddersfield Town 4–2 Lincoln City

Round 4: Huddersfield Town 2–1 West Ham United

Round 5: Huddersfield Town 4–0 Middlesbrough

Round 6: Huddersfield Town 6–1 Tottenham Hotspur

Semi-Final: Huddersfield Town 2–2 Sheffield United
(at Old Trafford, Manchester)
Replay: Huddersfield Town 0–0 Sheffield United
(at Goodison Park, Liverpool)
Replay: Huddersfield Town 1–0 Sheffield United
(at Maine Road, Manchester)

Match details

References

External links
FA Cup Finals
FA Cup Final kits

FA Cup Finals
FA Cup Final 1928
FA Cup Final 1928
FA Cup
FA Cup Final
FA Cup Final